Jerry Pignolet (born 13 May 1956) is a sailor from Puerto Rico, who represented his country at the 1984 Summer Olympics in Los Angeles, United States as crew member in the Soling. With helmsman Eric Tulla and fellow crew member Ronnie Ramos they took the 19th place.

References

Living people
1956 births
Sailors at the 1984 Summer Olympics – Soling
Olympic sailors of Puerto Rico
Puerto Rican male sailors (sport)
20th-century Puerto Rican people